The swimming competition at the 2002 South American Games consisted of swimming events held August 6–9, 2002 in Belém, Brazil.

Results

Men's events

Women's events

References

2002 South American Games events
South American Games
2002